Statistics of Emperor's Cup in the 1923 season.

Overview
It was contested by 4 teams, and Astra Club won the championship.

Results

Semifinals
Kōbe Kōtō Shōgyō Gakkō 2–3 Nagoya Shukyu-dan
Hiroshima Daiichi Chūgaku (retired) – Astra Club

Final
 
Nagoya Shukyu-dan 1–2 Astra Club
Astra Club won the championship.

References

 NHK

Emperor's Cup
1923 in Japanese football